Idia scobialis, the smoky idia, is a litter moth of the family Erebidae. The species was first described by Augustus Radcliffe Grote in 1880. It is found in North America from Michigan, southern Quebec and Maine, south to Florida and at least Kentucky.

The wingspan is about 20 mm. There is one generation per year.

Larvae feed on detritus, including dead leaves.

References

Herminiinae
Moths of North America
Moths described in 1880